The 2018 African Handball Super Cup (24th edition), also known as Babacar Fall Super Cup, in honour of the first chairman of the African Handball Confederation, was a handball competition organized by the African Handball Confederation, under the auspices of the International Handball Federation, the handball sport governing body. The matches, held on 12 April 2018 at the Salle Omnisport Al Inbiâat, in Cairo, Egypt, were contested by Zamalek, the 2017 African Handball Champions League winner and Al Ahly, the 2017 African Handball Cup Winners' Cup winner, on the man's side and Clube Desportivo Primeiro de Agosto, the 2017 African Women's Handball Champions League winner and FAP Yaoundé, the 2017 African Women's Handball Cup Winners' Cup runner-up (Primeiro de Agosto was the winner as well). Zamalek, on the man's side and Primeiro de Agosto, on the woman's side, were the winners.

2018 Africa Men's Handball Super Cup

2018 Africa Women's Handball Super Cup

Awards

See also
 2018 African Handball Champions League
 2018 African Women's Handball Champions League
 2018 African Handball Cup Winners' Cup
 2018 African Women's Handball Cup Winners' Cup

References

External links
 Official website

Africa Handball Super Cup
Africa Handball Super Cup
African Handball Super Cup
International handball competitions hosted by Egypt
African Handball Super Cup
April 2018 sports events in Egypt